James or Jim Barton may refer to:

 James Barton (actor) (1890–1962), American vaudevillian and character actor
 James R. Barton ( 1810–1856), sheriff of Los Angeles County, California
 Jim Barton (American football) (1934–2013), American football player
 Jim Barton (sailor) (born 1956), American Olympic sailor
 Jim Barton (politician) (born 1968), American politician in the Alabama House of Representatives
 James Barton (Emmerdale), a fictional character from the British soap opera Emmerdale
 James L. Barton (1855–1936), American missionary in Turkey